Joseph George Muha (April 28, 1921 – March 31, 1993) was an American football player, coach, and official.  He played professionally as a  fullback and linebacker in the National Football League (NFL) for five seasons with the Philadelphia Eagles.  He was their starting fullback four of those years and a two-time All-Pro selection.  Muha also was an umpire in the NFL from 1956 through 1971.  He wore uniform number 43, which was claimed the season following Muha's retirement by Red Cashion.

Muha  served as a second lieutenant in the United States Marine Corps from 1943 to 1947. He was inducted into the Virginia Sports Hall of Fame in 1976.
Muha received his Bachelor of Science in Civil Engineering from Virginia Military Institute, a Master of Arts in Economics from the University of Southern California and a Doctorate of Education from Nova Southwestern University, Florida.

References

External links

 

1921 births
1993 deaths
American football fullbacks
American football linebackers
National Football League officials
Philadelphia Eagles players
USC Trojans football coaches
VMI Keydets football players
United States Marine Corps personnel of World War II
United States Marine Corps officers
People from Somerset County, Pennsylvania
Players of American football from Pennsylvania
Military personnel from Pennsylvania